United Communist Party ( or VCP) is a small communist party in the Netherlands, formed in 1999, and mainly based in Oldambt and Pekela. It is a break-away party from the New Communist Party of the Netherlands (NCPN).

History
The VCP was created as a local split of the NCPN in north-east Groningen. The NCPN was created in 1992 by members of the Communist Party of the Netherlands (CPN) who opposed the merger of the CPN with other leftwing parties to form GroenLinks in the late eighties. North-east Groningen is historically a bulwark of support for the CPN, and later the NCPN.

The main reason of the split lied in a disagreement surrounding a large construction project, consisting of mainly expensive villas, called Blauwestad. The Scheemda chapter of the NCPN was opposed to the plan, while the Reiderland chapter was in favor. In Reiderland the NCPN was part of the governing coalition, whereas in Scheemda the party was part of the opposition. In 1999 this disagreement led to a definite split, with the Scheemda chapter forming the VCP.

In 2009 the municipalities of Scheemda and Reiderland merged to form the new municipality of Oldambt. Both the NCPN and the VCP contested the elections in the new municipality, however only the VCP won representation.

Election results

Ideology
The VCP describes itself as a party based upon scientific socialism as developed by Marx, Engels and Lenin. The party strives to eliminate, through democratic means, all elements of capitalism and its outgrowths, such as fascism, national socialism and all other forms of suppression and exploitation. In its day to day political work in Oldambt the party focuses on transparancy and the support of grassroots actions.

References

External links
  

Communist parties in the Netherlands
Regionalist parties in the Netherlands
Politics of Groningen (province)
Political parties established in 1999
1999 establishments in the Netherlands